The 18th Central American Championships in Athletics were held at the Estadio Nacional in San José, Costa Rica, between June 8-9, 2007. 

A total of 44 events were contested, 22 by men and 22 by women.

Medal summary

Complete results and medal winners were published.

Men

Women

Medal table

An unofficial medal count is in agreement with a medal table published by CACAC.

Team Ranking
Costa Rica won the overall team ranking.

Total

References

 
International athletics competitions hosted by Costa Rica
Central American Championships in Athletics
Central American Championships in Athletics
Central American Championships in Athletics
Sport in San José, Costa Rica
21st century in San José, Costa Rica